This is a list of presidents of Cambridge Union since its foundation in 1815.

1815–1916

It was resolved at a Private Business Meeting held on Monday, May 8, 1916, to hold no elections for terminal officers in the Easter Term, nor subsequently for the duration of War, and that the functions of the Standing Committee be performed by the ex officio members of the Committee.

1919–1939

The election of Officers was suspended and a Committee of Management appointed.

Chairmen of debates, 1939–1944

1944–present

The election of Officers was resumed.

Presidents elected a second time are marked with *
Presidents who resigned are marked with ‡
Presidents who resigned after being elected but prior to taking office, where known, are marked with ∂

Notes

 After a Presidential Interpretation in 2001, "any officer who resigns before completing their term in office should not be granted the status (of ex officio) unless there are extenuating circumstances."
 Following a constitutional change in July 2015, Presidents are automatically appointed as directors of the Union's subsidiary company, Cambridge Union Society Events Ltd.

Fictional Presidents

 Will Bailey, a fictional character in The West Wing, is stated to have been President of the Cambridge Union during his time at Cambridge.
 MacKenzie McHale, a fictional character in The Newsroom, another series created by Aaron Sorkin is also stated to have been President of the Cambridge Union.

Notes

References

External links 
Cambridge Union
Presidents of the Cambridge Union Society (1815-2005)

 List
Union